The Music Man is a 1962 American musical film directed and produced by Morton DaCosta, based on Meredith Willson's 1957 Broadway musical of the same name, which DaCosta also directed. Robert Preston reprises the title role from the stage version, starring alongside Shirley Jones, Buddy Hackett, Hermione Gingold, Ronny Howard, and Paul Ford.

Released by Warner Bros. on June 19, 1962, the film was one of the biggest hits of the year and was widely acclaimed by critics. It was nominated for six Academy Awards, including Best Picture, with composer Ray Heindorf winning Best Music, Scoring of Music, Adaptation or Treatment. The film also won the Golden Globe Award for Best Motion Picture – Musical or Comedy, and Preston and Jones were both nominated in their respective acting categories.  In 2005, the film was selected for preservation in the United States National Film Registry by the Library of Congress as being "culturally, historically, or aesthetically significant".

Plot 
In 1912, con man "Professor" Harold Hill arrives in fictional River City, Iowa, anxious to swindle the famously stubborn citizens. A few traveling salesmen in the area have heard about Hill, who is infamous for a ploy in which he gets townspeople to pay to create boys' marching bands, with Hill completely faking his musical expertise and skipping town once he has their money. 

Hill discovers that River City is the home of his former associate Marcellus Washburn; with Marcellus's help, Hill incites concern among River City's parents that their boys are being seduced into sin and vice by the town's new pool table. He suggests that a marching band can keep young boys out of trouble. Anticipating that Marian Paroo, the town's conscientious librarian and piano instructor, is suspicious of his motives, Hill sets out to seduce her. Also suspicious is the town's Mayor Shinn, owner of the billiard parlor, who orders the school board to obtain Hill's credentials. When they attempt to do so, Hill distracts them by teaching them to sing as a barbershop quartet. Thereafter, Hill easily tricks them into breaking into four-part harmony whenever they ask for his credentials.

Hill's wooing of Marian, who mistrusts him, has little effect, though he succeeds in winning the admiration of her mother and befriends her unhappy younger brother, Winthrop. When Marian discovers that Hill's claim to being a graduate of "Gary Conservatory, Gold Medal, Class of '05" is a lie (the town of Gary was founded in 1906, so there could be no music conservatory with that name before that date), she attempts to expose him, but is interrupted by the arrival of the Wells Fargo wagon. When Winthrop, after years of moody withdrawal, joins in the townspeople's singing and speaks effusively about his new cornet, Marian sees Hill's work as beneficial. Hill tells the boys to learn to play via the "Think System," in which they simply have to think of a tune over and over and will know how to play it without ever practicing on their instruments.

Hill's con is nearly complete: all he has to do is collect the rest of the money and disappear. Meeting Marian at the traditional footbridge—the first time she has ever been there with a man—he learns that she knew of his deception but did not tell because she is in love with him. He is about to leave town when Charlie Cowell, a disgruntled anvil salesman who was run out of Brighton, Illinois because Hill had conned the townspeople there, comes to River City and exposes Hill. Sought by an angry mob and pressed to leave town by Marcellus and Marian, Hill realizes he is in love with Marian and does not want to leave her.

Hill is captured by the mob and brought before a town meeting to be tarred and feathered. Marian defends Hill; the townspeople, reminded of how he has brought so many of them together, elect to relent. Mayor Shinn reminds the townspeople how much money Hill has taken, with no apparent result. When he demands to know "Where's the band?" Hill is saved by the town's boys, who play Beethoven's Minuet in G. Although their technique is awful, the boys' parents are enthralled. As the boys march out of the town hall, they are suddenly transformed in the townspeople's imagination into a spectacular marching band, playing and marching with perfection, led by Hill.

Cast

Casting notes 
The members of the original Broadway cast who appear in the film are Robert Preston (Harold Hill), Pert Kelton (Mrs. Paroo), The Buffalo Bills (The School Board), Peggy Mondo (Ethel Toffelmier), and Adina Rice (Alma Hix). Paul Ford (Mayor Shinn) was a replacement during the original run. Susan Luckey (Zaneeta Shinn) and Harry Hickox (Charlie Cowell) both reprise their roles from the first national tour while Monique Vermont (Amaryllis) was a replacement.

Although Preston scored a great success in the original stage version of the show, he was not the first choice for the film version, mostly because he was not a major box office star. Jack L. Warner was notorious for wanting to film stage musicals with bigger stars than the ones who played the roles onstage. James Cagney and Bing Crosby were offered the role of Harold Hill, but both turned it down. Warner also offered the part to Cary Grant, but he declined, saying "Nobody could do that role as well as Bob Preston." Grant also told Warner that he wouldn't bother to see the film unless Preston was in it. Warner then intended Frank Sinatra for the Harold Hill role, but was finally foiled by Meredith Willson. Willson reminded Warner that the author-composer had cast approval written into his contract, and threatened to cancel the entire project unless Preston played the lead.

Songs
Warner Bros. Records issued the soundtrack album in both stereophonic and monaural versions.

Source: AllMusic

"Main Title/Rock Island" – Orchestra, The Traveling Salesmen
"Iowa Stubborn" – The Ensemble 
"Ya Got Trouble" – Robert Preston, The Ensemble
"Piano Lesson" – Shirley Jones, Pert Kelton
"Goodnight, My Someone" – Jones
"Ya Got Trouble/Seventy-Six Trombones" – Preston, The Ensemble 
"Sincere" – Buffalo Bills
"Pick-a-Little, Talk-a-Little" – Hermione Gingold, Mary Wickes, Peggy Mondo, Sara Seegar, Adnia Rice
"The Sadder But Wiser Girl" – Preston, Buddy Hackett
"Marian The Librarian" – Preston
"Gary, Indiana" – Preston, Kelton
"Being in Love" – Jones
"The Wells Fargo Wagon" – The Ensemble
"Lida Rose/Will I Ever Tell You?" –  Jones, Buffalo Bills
"Gary, Indiana" (reprise) – Ronny Howard, Kelton, Jones
"Lida Rose" (reprise) – Buffalo Bills
"Shipoopi" – Hackett, The Ensemble 
"Till There Was You" – Jones
"It's You" – Buffalo Bills (does not appear on soundtrack album)
"Goodnight, My Someone" (reprise) – Jones,  Preston
"Till There Was You" (reprise)– Preston
"Seventy-Six Trombones" (reprise & finale) – The Ensemble

During the recording of the soundtrack musical numbers in late 1961 and early 1962 to which the cast would later lip-sync on the soundstage, some sessions included work on the song "Chicken Fat", a.k.a. President Kennedy's "Youth Fitness Song", performed by Preston.

Production

Unusual for a musical film at the time, Morton DaCosta, who had directed the stage version of the musical, not only directed the film but produced it as well, ensuring that the film was faithful to the show. In addition to Preston, the actress Pert Kelton and the Buffalo Bills also reprised their stage roles.

All of the show's songs were retained in their full versions with three exceptions: "Rock Island" was slightly edited, the middle verse of "My White Knight" was retained but the remainder of the song was replaced with "Being In Love" with new music and lyrics by Willson, and "It's You" was initially heard as incidental music and later sung by the school board in abbreviated form in the fairground scene, prior to Cowell exposing Hill as a fraud to the River City townspeople.

Several phrases were altered for the film, as the writers felt they were too obscurely Midwestern to appeal to a broader audience; the minced oath "Jeely kly!" is Tommy Djilas's catchphrase in the play, while in the film he exclaims, "Great honk!" The word "shipoopi," which has no meaning and was concocted by Willson for the original Broadway show, was left unchanged.

When Amaryllis plays "Goodnight My Someone", she is playing the keys C, G, and E on the piano, but the notes actually heard are B, F#, and D#. Marian sings the song in B major.

It is revealed that "Harold Hill" is an alias used by the salesman while in River City. Early in the film, Hill runs into an old friend and crony Marcellus where the latter now works in the livery stable. Marcellus recognizes him and calls him by his (presumably) real name, "Gregory."

Shirley Jones was pregnant while the film was in production. When she and Preston embraced during the footbridge scene, the baby—who would be born on January 4 and would be named Patrick Cassidy—kicked Preston. The costume designers had to adjust her dresses several times to conceal her pregnancy.

For the final parade scene, Jack L. Warner selected the University of Southern California's marching band, the Spirit of Troy. Many junior high school students from Southern California were also included, forming the majority of the band. It took approximately eight hours of shooting over two days to film the scene. All the musical instruments for the production were specially made for the film by the Olds Instrument Company in Fullerton, California. The instruments were then refurbished and sold by Olds with no indication they were ever used in the film.

Release
The film had its premiere in Mason City, Iowa, the home town of Meredith Willson, during the North Iowa Band Festival on June 19, 1962.

Reception

The film received positive reviews and grossed $14,953,846 at the box office, earning $8.1 million in US theatrical rentals. It was the 3rd highest-grossing film of 1962.

Bosley Crowther in The New York Times wrote "It's here, and the rich, ripe roundness of it, the lush amalgam of the many elements of successful American show business that Mr. Willson brought together on the stage, has been preserved and appropriately made rounder and richer through the magnitude of film."

Robert Landry of Variety wrote: "Call this a triumph, perhaps a classic, of corn, smalltown nostalgia and American love of a parade...DaCosta’s use of several of the original Broadway cast players is thoroughly vindicated...But the only choice for the title role, Robert Preston, is the big proof of showmanship in the casting. Warners might have secured bigger screen names but it is impossible to imagine any of them matching Preston’s authority, backed by 883 stage performances."

Stanley Kauffmann of The New Republic wrote 'Robert Preston is a likable man whose likableness let him give one of the best phony performances of the postwar era, in that phony musical The Music Man'.

Leo Charney reviewing for AllMovie wrote that the film "is among the best movie musicals, transforming Meredith Willson's Broadway hit into an energetic slice of Americana. Robert Preston's virtuoso portrayal of con man Harold Hill transfers from the stage (despite the studio's nervousness about casting no-name Preston), and the result is one of the most explosively vital performances in any movie musical."

In 2005, The Music Man was selected for preservation in the United States National Film Registry by the Library of Congress as being "culturally, historically, or aesthetically significant".

The film is recognized by American Film Institute in these lists:
 2004: AFI's 100 Years...100 Songs:
 "Seventy-Six Trombones" – Nominated
 2006: AFI's Greatest Movie Musicals – Nominated

Accolades
The film won one award at the 35th Academy Awards and was nominated for five more.

Comic book adaptation
 Dell Movie Classic: The Music Man (January 1963)

See also 
The Music Man (2003 film)
"Marge vs. the Monorail", an episode of The Simpsons which is largely an homage to The Music Man.
List of American films of 1962
Elinor Glyn, a romance novelist that Marian disapproves of

References

External links

 
 
 
 
 
 

1962 films
1962 musical comedy films
American musical comedy films
American romantic comedy films
American romantic musical films
Best Musical or Comedy Picture Golden Globe winners
Films that won the Best Original Score Academy Award
Films based on musicals
Films set in Iowa
Films set in 1912
Films about music and musicians
Films about con artists
Films about children
Films scored by Ray Heindorf
Films adapted into comics
Independence Day (United States) films
United States National Film Registry films
Warner Bros. films
Films directed by Morton DaCosta
The Music Man
1960s English-language films
1960s American films